Alfred Ernest Evans (9 June 1917 – 14 June 1992) was an Australian rules footballer who played for the North Melbourne Football Club in the Victorian Football League (VFL).

Notes

External links 

1917 births
1992 deaths
Australian rules footballers from Victoria (Australia)
North Melbourne Football Club players